Durrie Station most commonly referred to as Durrie is a pastoral lease that operates as a cattle station in Queensland.

Description
The Diamantina River and several of its associated tributaries run through the property. The  Diamantina overflow swamp is situated on Durrie, the swamp is a DIWA nationally important wetland.
 
On an average season Durrie is stocked with 9,000 head of cattle.

History
The traditional owners of the area are the Karwali people, who have lived in the area for tens of thousands of years.

Karuwali (also known as Garuwali, Dieri) is a language of far western Queensland. The Karuwali language region includes the landscape within the local government boundaries of the Diamantina Shire Council, including the localities of Betoota and Haddon Corner.

The property was established some time prior to 1897 when it was feared that ticks from cattle in the Northern Territory would infect the Queensland herd unless a quarantine line was formed.

Durrie was taken up in around 1908 by William Naughton, a prominent pastoralist of the time, when it took up an area of  who stocked it over the course of two years with 8,000 head of cattle.

Kidman acquired Durrie in 1913 when he bought it from the Naughton Brothers. Durrie adjoined Monkira and Bluff Stations which were both already owned by Kidman.

The area was struck by drought from 1913 to early 1915 resulting in the deaths of huge numbers of stock. Kidman estimated that he lost 60,000 head on his properties in the Channel Country like Durrie, Diamantina Lakes, Durham Downs, Morney Plains and Carrawilla.

Airmail delivery to remote properties in outback South Australia, New South Wales and Queensland commenced in 1949. Durrie along with other remote properties including Mungerannie, Clifton Hills, Glengyle, Davenport Downs, Morney Plains, Mount Leonard, Mulka, Cordillo Downs, Tanbar, Durham Downs, Nappa Merrie, Lake Pure and Naryilco were also on the route.

After heavy rains in 1950 the Diamantina floodwaters reached records levels and the homestead was inundated. The McAuley family who were living at the homestead had to seek higher ground. The family camped on a nearby sand-hill for a week until the floodwaters receded.

Diamantina Overflow Swamp
It is composed of floodplain, swamps and anastomosing channels of the Diamantina River composed of very deep grey cracking clays. The water in the swamp is fresh and remains wet well into the dry season.
The major habitats found within the area include vast areas of lignum, Muehlenbeckia florulenta, open shrubland and of sedgeland dominated by Eleocharis between the lignum.

See also
List of ranches and stations
List of the largest stations in Australia

References

Stations (Australian agriculture)
Pastoral leases in Queensland
Central West Queensland